2002–03 Eerste Klasse was a Dutch association football season of the Eerste Klasse.

Saturday champions were:
A: Ajax Amateurs
B: SV ARC
C: Achilles Veen
D: Sparta Nijkerk
E: Oranje Nassau Groningen

Sunday champions were:
A: AFC '34
B: SVVSMC
C: RKSV Nuenen
D: RKSV Groene Ster
E: Rohda Raalte
F: SC Joure

Eerste Klasse seasons
4